Tarhaouhaout is a village in the commune of Tamanrasset, in Tamanrasset District, Tamanrasset Province, Algeria. Fort Motylinsky is located nearby.

References

Neighbouring towns and cities

Populated places in Tamanrasset Province